Canyon High School is a traditional four-year high school located in the Anaheim Hills community in the city of Anaheim, California and is an International Baccalaureate school. The school, which opened its doors in 1973, has a student population of 2,400. The school primarily serves the community of Anaheim Hills as well as parts of East Anaheim and Orange, and was designated a California Distinguished School in 2007 by the California Department of Education. The school's fight song is Washington and Lee Swing. The school is currently ranked as one of the top 1,000 high schools in the United States by Newsweek at number 128, a distinction given to less than 1% of high schools nationally. It is the 204th highest ranked school in the state of California.

History
The school started in 1974 as a shared campus with the established Villa Park High School for students in grades 10-12. Upon completion of the Anaheim Hills campus, a variety of names were considered for the site. A ballot of three proposed names was given to the students of Vista Del Rio Jr. High School to vote on.  The students did not like any of the choices so a write-in campaign was started. Canyon High School was the name of choice due to its location and the fact that the local students call that area "The Canyon".

Ultimately, the name Canyon High School was selected. Boundary changes in the district and an increase in the population of the Anaheim Hills community resulted in changes at the school. The school was designated to serve students in grades 9 through 12 in 1987, and El Rancho Charter School was designated as the only feeder school within the boundaries of Canyon High School. The school implemented an International Baccalaureate Program in 1988.

Education

Canyon High School offers a variety of programs for its students including the International Baccalaureate Program, Stellar Technology Program, and Specialized Science Program, in addition to numerous college-level Advanced Placement and Honors courses. 

The school focuses on technology, having undergone thousands of dollars worth of upgrading the schools technology, by adding 100 computers, and making 19 of its courses available as online classes. Canyon is also home to Orange County's only high school Aviation Academy which uses advanced simulators and encourages students to explore career options in the Aviation industry with an emphasis on becoming pilots. In 2019, the U.S. News & World Report ranked the school 387th in the state of California and 2,557th in the United States.

Athletics 
The school mascot is the Comanche. Students at Canyon High School compete in the following sports:

Baseball
Basketball
Cheer
Color Guard
Cross Country
Dance Team
Football
Lacrosse
Golf
Marching Band
Roller Hockey
Soccer
Softball
Song Team
Swimming
Tennis
Track & Field
Ultimate Frisbee
Volleyball
Water Polo
Winter Drumline
Wrestling

Notable alumni
David Buehler, National Football League kicker
Eden Espinosa, singer/stage actress
Seonna Hong, artist
Courtney Mathewson, Olympic gold medalist water polo player
Connie Needham, actress
Brian Nestande, California State Assemblyman
Andy Park, Illustrator
Chris Snitko, Major League Soccer player
Kwame Watson-Siriboe, Major League Soccer player

Professional baseball players
John Cummings, pitcher
Rob Deer, All-Star right fielder
Grant Green, second baseman
Doug Linton, pitcher
Vinnie Pestano, pitcher
Steve Scarsone, second baseman
Eric Valent, first baseman
Christian Colon, shortstop

References

External links 
https://www.canyonhighschool.org/

Educational institutions established in 1973
High schools in Anaheim, California
International Baccalaureate schools in California
Public high schools in California
1973 establishments in California